Delhi Faridabad Skyway (D F Skyway) is a 4.4 km long, 6-lane wide elevated highway that connects Delhi with Faridabad, a prominent city in National Capital Region. It was inaugurated on 29 November 2010. The project was undertaken by concessionaire "Badarpur Faridabad Tollway Limited", a subsidiary of Hindustan Construction Company Limited.  The highway begins at Badarpur, Delhi and ends at Sector 37, Faridabad, Haryana.

It is a part of NHAI's North-South corridor, National Highway 44, which connects Srinagar to Kanyakumari.

Exits
The following table lists the exits in Faridabad and Delhi.

Toll Charges
The following table lists the past and current toll charges:

See also
 Expressways & highways in Haryana

References

External links 
 Road Map reference at National Highways Authority of India
 Project reference

Transport in Delhi
Expressways in Delhi
Expressways in Haryana
Transport in Faridabad
Transport in Haryana
2010 establishments in India
South Delhi district
Toll roads in India